PacketVideo Corporation or PV was a San Diego-based company that produced software for wireless multimedia, including the display of video on mobile handsets. The PacketVideo name wasn't actively used after being acquired by Lynx Technology.

History
PV was founded in San Diego, California on 10 August 1998 by James C. Brailean, Cheuk Chan, Osama Al-shaykh, Gene Wen and Mark R Banham. In 2003 PacketVideo sold its infrastructure division to Alcatel.  In 2005, PacketVideo was acquired in NextWave Wireless.  In 2010, PacketVideo became a wholly owned subsidiary of NTT DoCoMo. Corporate parent NTT DOCOMO sold PacketVideo NorthAmerica and Europe to Lynx Technology on 10 May 2015 and the remaining portion, PacketVideo Japan, exactly one year later on 10 May 2016.

Products
PV's customers include mobile operators such as Verizon Wireless, NTT DoCoMo and Orange, handset manufacturers, and consumer electronics companies. PV's software is embedded in more than 249 million devices worldwide and more than 248 different products.

Major product groups from PV are:
CORE, which provides a universal structure for mobile multimedia applications. CORE is an established framework that can support any media services. 
MediaFusion, a white-label client-server software application to develop and launch on-device portals for rich media services. 
TwonkyMedia suite of products that connect home entertainment devices.

Locations
PacketVideo has presence in three continents, with its headquarters in San Diego. Major development centers are in San Diego, Chicago, Chandigarh, Charlotte, Tokyo, Tampere, Berlin, Boston, and Basel. Sales and customer support centers are in San Diego, Chicago, Charlotte, Tokyo, Tampere, Nice, and Basel.

Affiliations 
PacketVideo is a member of industry forum and consortiums, including the Open Handset Alliance, 3rd Generation Partnership Project, Broadcast Mobile Convergence Forum, FLO Forum, International Multimedia Telecommunications Consortium, Mobile DTV Alliance, MPEG Industry Forum, Open Mobile Alliance, and the Digital Living Network Alliance

References

References

Companies formerly listed on the Nasdaq
Software companies based in California
Companies based in San Diego
Mobile technology
Defunct software companies of the United States